Jordan Beck can refer to:

Jordan Beck (baseball) (born 2001), American baseball player
Jordan Beck (American football) (born 1983), former American football player
a tributary of the Black Dub stream in Cambria, United Kingdom